Jānis Medenis (May 31, 1903 – May 10, 1961) was a Latvian poet and writer. In 1948, he was convicted of anti-Soviet activities, and imprisoned in the Norillag camp, later in Irkutsk Oblast until 1955.

1903 births
1961 deaths
People from Madona Municipality
People from Kreis Wenden
Latvian poets
Latvian writers
20th-century poets
Norillag detainees